Chikhirtma is a traditional Georgian soup. Chikhirtma is described as a soup almost completely without a vegetable base.

Recipe
The soup is made with rich chicken broth, which is thickened with beaten eggs (or only yolks) and lemon curd. The technique of inclusion of uncooked eggs to hot broth is rather difficult. The technique appeared in Ancient Persia and is intended for the creation of an intimate blend of broth and eggs.

For this purpose, eggs are blended into the bowl with a little lukewarm broth, which is blended in turn with a little flour (traditionally cornmeal) and some acid (pomegranate or lemon juice, wine, vinegar). This blend is added gradually to the hot broth with constant stirring over 5–7 minutes.

Before removing meat from broth, add flour and onion, then put down to soup. Except usual for the Georgian cuisine herbs and spices (like chili powder, tagetes, leaves of coriander, basil, parsley, celery), cinnamon, peppermint, and seeds of coriander must be added.

References

External links
 William Pokhlyobkin. Secret of good cooking. (in Russian)
 William Pokhlyobkin. Georgian cuisine. (in Russian)

Georgian soups